Donato J. Tramuto (born 1956) is an American healthcare executive, global health activist, author and former CEO of Tivity Health. Tramuto is focused on addressing the social determinants of health. In 2008, he founded an online service for drug detailing and sampling, Aptus Health (formerly Physicians Interactive), which by 2015 had a membership of 3 million healthcare practitioners. He also founded The TramutoPorter Foundation and a nonprofit program, Health eVillages, to provide curated medical information to clinicians in remote areas.

In 2013 he was elected to the board of healthcare firm Healthways Inc. after an activist shareholder threatened a proxy fight over its performance; two years later he was appointed president and CEO. He restructured the company and rebranded it as Tivity Health.

Tramuto was elected to the Town of Ogunquit Board of Selectmen in 2006 and served two terms as chairman.

Tramtuo is focused on addressing the social determinants of health and a new leadership model focused on Compassionate Leadership through his 2nd book, The Double Bottom Line: How Compassionate Leaders Captivate Hearts and Deliver Results

Early life and education 

At age 7 a middle-ear infection left Tramuto unable to hear or speak clearly. Ten years later a surgical operation restored some but not all of his hearing and fluency.

Tramuto attended Wadhams Hall Seminary-College from 1975 to 1979, graduating with a B.A. degree in philosophy. He then studied healthcare marketing at the State University of New York–Buffalo for two years.

Business career 

Tramuto taught for a semester at Gannon, a Roman Catholic diocesan university, before making a career change to pharmaceutical marketing at Marion Laboratories.

From 1982 to 1990 Tramuto worked at Boehringer-Ingelheim Pharmaceuticals, becoming district manager. He then was hired by Caremark as its vice president for Disease Management Marketing and general manager of its Home Healthcare business unit. He spent four years advocating and directing the development of the company's first AIDS management program.

In 1998 Tramuto co-founded Protocare, Inc., a drug development firm with a healthcare-services consulting division. In 2002 he sold one part to Radiant Research and the other to Constella Health Strategies, which was integrated into UnitedHealth Group a year later. From 2004 to 2006, Mr. Tramuto was chief executive officer of i3, a global pharmaceutical services company that, prior to its sale to inVentiv Health, Inc. in 2011, was part of Ingenix (a subsidiary of UnitedHealth Group Incorporated).

From 2006 to 2008, Tramuto served as president of the Physicians Interactive Division of Allscripts.

In 2008 Tramuto founded Physicians Interactive Holdings, which provided mobile and Web-based medical reference tools, electronic drug sampling, and interactive education to the healthcare industry. Venture capital was supplied by Perseus, a private equity firm. The company's proprietary technology could be used to transmit a patient's medical data to a physician through a handheld device. After the 2010 earthquake in Haiti, physicians there used it to communicate with medical experts in the U.S.

In 2013 Perseus sold the company to Merck, with Tramuto remaining in place as CEO.

In May 2013 Tramuto was elected to serve as an outside director of health-and-wellness company Healthways Inc.; its shareholders had voted to declassify its staggered board of directors after the New York State Common Retirement Fund claimed that the directors had entrenched themselves. He was appointed chairman a year later. In 2015 the company announced his appointment as president and CEO, passing over a corporate officer who had applied for the job.

In July 2016 Tramuto sold Healthways' unprofitable population-health business, along with its brand name, to allow the company to focus on its fitness and rehabilitation programs, under a new name ("Tivity Health").

In March 2019, Tivity Health announced the completion of its acquisition of Nutrisystem, Inc., a leading provider of weight management products and services.

In February 2020, Tramuto stepped down as CEO of Tivity Health.

Philanthropy and boards 

In 2001, Tramuto founded the TramutoPorter Foundation in memory of two close friends and their son who lost their lives aboard flight 175 on September 11. The foundation provides scholarships to underprivileged students, as well as providing grants to empower organizations whose single mission it is to better the lives of others.

In 2011, Tramuto established a nonprofit, Health eVillages, to distribute handheld devices loaded with medical reference materials to healthcare workers in remote regions of the world. In 2014 the Robert F. Kennedy Center for Justice and Human Rights gave him an RFK Ripple of Hope award for his charitable work in the global healthcare field.

In 2016 Tramuto wrote a memoir, Life’s Bulldozer Moments: How Adversity Leads to Success in Life and Business, about obstacles he had encountered in early life and traumatic events that had caused him to feel survivor guilt; he said that these experiences ("life's bulldozer moments") motivated him to succeed in business and do charitable work.

In December 2018, the TramutoPorter Foundation Donated $1 Million to Robert F. Kennedy Human Rights to Launch Workplace Dignity and Inclusion Initiative.

Tramuto serves on the board of the TramutoPorter Foundation, Health eVillages, Robert F Kennedy Human Rights US, Zeel Health, Esperta Health, Robert F Kennedy Europe where he serves as co-chairman. He is on the advisory board of Boston University School of Public Health, Gryphon Private Equity, Y2X Life Sciences, Gento Health, and chairs the executive advisory board for BioIQ.

In 2020 he was appointed Honorary Scholar in Residence at St. Joseph's College in Maine; Executive in Residence at Promerica Health, Tidesmart Health, Concierge Health, Skyscape and Sharecare.

In 2022, the National Calendar Association awarded the TramutoPorter Foundation the honor of establishing National Compassionate Leadership Week to be calendared every year during the second week of September in perpetuity.

Political activities 

Tramuto was elected to the Town of Ogunquit's board of selectmen in 2006 on a write-in campaign. He served two three-year terms. While chairman (2007–12), he represented the town to the governor of Maine on issues related to education and health. In 2010 the governor appointed him to the State of Maine Economic Growth Council, which develops and evaluates the state's long-term economic growth plan.

Books

Awards and honors

RFK Ripple of Hope Award

RFK Embracing the Legacy Award 

Red Jacket Award 

H.I.T Men and Women Award

Named a Health Care Hero by the Nashville Business Journal 

Named by the Boston Globe as one of the 12 Most Innovative People in Massachusetts

Named a Most Admired CEO by the Nashville Business Journal 

Received an honorary doctorate of Humane Letters from University of Massachusetts Lowell 

Received an honorary doctorate of Science from Thomas Jefferson University 

Received an honorary doctorate of Humane Letters from Lasell College 

Received an honorary doctorate of Public Service from Saint Joseph’s College of Maine

Received an honorary doctorate of Laws from Regis College of Boston, Massachusetts

References

External links 
 Official profile at Tramuto Foundation
 Bloomberg Business biography

American technology company founders
American technology chief executives
American health care chief executives
American nonprofit chief executives
American philanthropists
1956 births
Living people
People from Ogunquit, Maine
Maine city council members
University at Buffalo alumni
Merck & Co. people